Jacob Wukie (born May 11, 1986, in Massillon, Ohio) is an American archer. At the 2012 Summer Olympics he competed for his country in the Men's team event and the men's individual event.  He won a silver Olympic medal along with his teammates Brady Ellison and Jake Kaminski.  In the individual event he finished 12th in the ranking round, before eliminating Jayanta Talukdar in the first round.  He was himself then knocked out by Bård Nesteng.

He has qualified to represent the United States at the 2020 Summer Olympics.

Wukie, a devout Christian, is one of four children of John and Patty Wukie. Wukie attended James Madison University in Harrisonburg, Virginia. He married Brianne Pinkerton on December 1, 2012.

References

External links
 
 
 

American male archers
Living people
Archers at the 2012 Summer Olympics
1986 births
Olympic silver medalists for the United States in archery
Medalists at the 2012 Summer Olympics
Sportspeople from Massillon, Ohio
Archers at the 2020 Summer Olympics